Alberto Horacio Suppici (20 November 1898 – 21 June 1981) was a Uruguayan footballer and coach who won the first ever FIFA World Cup, leading the Uruguay team in the 1930 tournament on home soil. Suppici is known as el Profesor (the Professor). His cousin was the professional driver Héctor Suppici Sedes.

Biography
On 22 April 1917, Suppici founded the football club Plaza Colonia in Colonia del Sacramento, his hometown. The club's 12 000-capacity home ground has been named Estadio Profesor Alberto Suppici in his honour.

As technical director of Uruguay, Suppici coached the side to third in the 1929 South American Championship, the precursor to the modern Copa América.

At the inaugural FIFA World Cup in his home nation of Uruguay, Suppici dropped goalkeeper Andrés Mazali, who had won a gold medal in the 1928 Olympic final, from the national team after he was caught breaking curfew and failing to arrive at the team hotel in time in Montevideo prior to the tournament. Suppici led the side to victory in the final over Argentina at Estadio Centenario in Montevideo, masterminding a second-half comeback from 2 to 1 down to win 4–2 in front of 93,000 people. Suppici's technical staff at the tournament included Pedro Arispe, Ernesto Figoli, Luis Greco and Pedro Olivieri. He is the youngest ever coach to win a World Cup, aged only 31.

Honours

Manager

Domestic
 Peñarol
Uruguayan Primera División: 1945

International
Uruguay
 FIFA World Cup: 1930
 Copa América runner-up: 1941; third place: 1929, 1937

References

1898 births
1981 deaths
People from Colonia del Sacramento
Uruguayan footballers
Uruguayan people of Italian descent
Club Nacional de Football players
Uruguayan football managers
1930 FIFA World Cup managers
FIFA World Cup-winning managers
Uruguay national football team managers
Association football defenders